Mark Kaplan may refer to:

 Mark Kaplan (musician) (born 1953), American violinist
 Mark Kaplan (tennis) (born 1967), South African tennis player
 Mark E. Kaplan (born 1967), Florida politician
 Mark N. Kaplan, American lawyer and business executive